Pelageya Sergeyevna Khanova (born 1986) is а Russian singer.

Pelageya may also refer to:
 Pelageya Danilova (1918–2001), Russian artistic gymnast
 Pelageya Polubarinova-Kochina (1899–1999), Soviet applied mathematician
 Pelageya Shajn or Shayn (1894–1956), Soviet–Russian astronomer

See also 
 Saint Pelagia, a legendary Christian saint and hermit in the 4th or 5th century
 Pelagia (disambiguation)